Route 289 is a two-lane north/south highway on the south shore of the Saint Lawrence River in the Bas-Saint-Laurent region of eastern Quebec, Canada. Its northern terminus is in Saint-André-de-Kamouraska at the junction of Route 132 and the southern terminus is at the border of New Brunswick where it continues as Route 120.

Route 289 is also designated as the "route des Frontières" tourism highway.

List of towns along Route 289
 Saint-Marc-du-Lac-Long
 Riviere-Bleue
 Pohénégamook
 Saint-Alexandre-de-Kamouraska

See also
 List of Quebec provincial highways

References

External links 
 Provincial Route Map (Courtesy of the Quebec Ministry of Transportation) 
 Route 289 on Google Maps

289